They (also known as Wes Craven Presents: They) is a 2002 American supernatural horror film, directed by Robert Harmon and starring Laura Regan, Ethan Embry, Dagmara Dominczyk, Jay Brazeau, and Marc Blucas. The plot is centered on a group of four adults experiencing night terrors and attempting to deal with the fallout from their prior childhood experiences. The film was produced by Ted Field and Tom Engleman; Wes Craven served as one of its executive producers and was its presenter.

The film was released during the Thanksgiving week and received generally negative reviews, though Laura Regan's performance received significant praise. The film was also a box office bomb, grossing only $16.1 million against its $17 million budget.

Plot

In 1983, a young boy named Billy Parks is frightened and has difficulty falling asleep after waking up from a nightmare. His mother Mary assures him the monster he thinks is in the closet is imaginary. As he tries to fall asleep again, a dark apparition emerges from his closet and spirits him away.

In present-day 2002, the plot focuses on a Psychology grad student named Julia Lund and the events that turned her life upside down. As a child, she experienced horrifying night terrors that manifested after witnessing her father commit suicide but has seemingly overcome the problem. She reunites with a childhood friend, a now grown-up Billy. In the diner, Billy is constantly startled by the flickering lights, as he is now deathly afraid of the dark. He tells her that he believes their night terrors are caused by something otherworldly, as he was kidnapped by mysterious creatures as a child and went missing for two days. He warns her to stay out of the dark before shooting himself.

Julia stays over at her paramedic boyfriend Paul Loomis' apartment for comfort and to grieve. Loomis has two roommates whom he is subservient to, paying their portion of the rent and utilities. When he passively asks them to contribute, they mock him, to the point of joking about keeping the money he gave them for the electric bill. The roommates, not him, appear in charge even when one of them sees his girlfriend nude and flirts with her. That night Julia hears the shower running and investigates to find a mysterious black fluid erupting from the sink drain, and the bathroom mirror reveals an opening to alternate dimension filled with mysterious creatures. Paul hears her screams and comes to her aid only to find her alone. He suggests that she might have been sleepwalking, since she does not remember what happened.

At his funeral, Julia consoles Billy's parents and meets up with two of his friends and roommates, Terry Alba and Sam Burnside, who slowly begin to believe his claims, as they also experienced night terrors as children and suspect they are returning. Offended by Sam's careless comments, Julia visits Billy's childhood room and discovers his drawer filled with batteries. Terry shows up and apologizes for Sam's insensitivity and informs her that Billy used to talk a lot about Julia and his experiences with night terrors, and why he was obsessed with staying out of the dark.

As Julia is driving in the middle of nowhere, an unknown creature sprints across the windshield as the SUV engine mysteriously stops. As Julia attempts to restart the SUV, she is startled by a vision of Billy and falls over backwards onto the road only to nearly get hit by an oncoming semi-truck. Julia visits Paul's apartment for comfort only to discover him drunk with his friends Troy and Darren. She leaves in disgust.

At Terry and Sam's apartment, the trio study Billy's diary. Terry and Sam ask Julia if she has experienced any return of the night terrors, which she denies. Terry explains her night terrors started when she was 5 years old, after witnessing her sister drown in a lake where her family would spend their summers. In one instance, she disappeared from her bedroom and returned in the dog house, and as her father reached in to get her, she stabbed him in the eye with a kitchen knife, as she was convinced he was some kind of demon.

Julia is at first skeptical but slowly starts to believe in her friends' stories after meeting a little girl named Sarah, one of Dr. Booth's patients who also suffers from night terrors which started after her mother's untimely death. Sarah claims "They" are going to eat her in her horrible nightmares, and the only thing that keeps them away is lights. She then starts picking at a strange mark on her arm, a similar mark that also appeared on Billy's hand, Sam's shoulder, and Terry's ankle. Terry and Sam are soon taken by the creatures.

Julia finally believes the stories when she discovers the mark left by "Them" on her forehead and pulls out a long black needle. She runs to Paul's apartment in fear. Paul, now convinced that Julia is insane, drugs her drink with a sleeping pill and attempts to call Dr. Booth. Realizing he drugged her, she runs to the subway station to vomit the sleeping pill out, only to get trapped in the station as the closing gates lock her in.

Trapped, she is forced to ride a train home and is the only passenger. The train's lights start to flicker, and the vehicle stops completely. She gets off and sees all the light bulbs burst in the train tunnel before the creatures assault her. Julia manages to escape and is finally discovered by a group of tunnel workers who attempt to help her, only for Julia to violently assault them with shards of glass, convinced they are not human.

She is committed to Dr. Booth's mental institution, where she is attacked once more and transported into the separate dimension she previously saw, only this time inside of a closet. She screams for help to Dr. Booth and an orderly, neither of whom can see or hear her. Dr. Booth closes the door, and the creatures drag Julia away.

Cast
 Laura Regan as Julia Lund
 Jessica Amlee as Young Julia
 Marc Blucas as Paul Loomis
 Ethan Embry as Sam Burnside
 Dagmara Dominczyk as Terry Alba
 Jon Abrahams as Billy Parks
 Alexander Gould as Young Billy
 Jay Brazeau as Dr. Booth
 Jodelle Micah Ferland as Sarah
 Desiree Zurowski as Mary Parks
 Mark Hildreth as Troy
 Jonathan Cherry as Darren
 Peter LaCroix as David Parks
 L. Harvey Gold as Professor Crowley
 David Abbott as Professor Adkins

Production
The initial script featured godlike, organic machines who used humans for spare parts.  This was rewritten from scratch by the producers. They was Radar's first film production.

Release
Dimension purchased the distribution rights after footage was shown in England. They received its US premiere on November 27, 2002. In its opening weekend They grossed about $5.1 million. The film grossed $12.8 million in the US and $3.3 million overseas, making for a total worldwide gross of $16.1 million.

Home media
The film was released on VHS and DVD on June 10, 2003. The film received its Blu-ray release on September 11, 2012 through Echo Bridge Entertainment, in a double feature with another Wes Craven film, Cursed.

Deleted scenes
There were scenes that were filmed but excluded from the final cut; the first two are available on the Japanese DVD and include:
 After Julia sees Sarah's mark on her arm she leaves Dr. Booth's waiting room with him walking in to find her gone. Julia is seen at a hardware store purchasing lighting supplies afterwards. The cashier asks her if she is going camping but she does not respond.
 Julia is seen packing in her bedroom to prepare for Billy's funeral while Paul makes her breakfast. The two then share an intimate moment before she leaves for the funeral.
 After Julia pulls out the splinter from her forehead she runs over to Sam's apartment as he is being attacked by "They", after calling out his name a few times more Sam's corpse is thrown through a window and lands on top of her, a monster on his back growls at Julia as it pulls his corpse into the shadows.

These deleted scenes were all included in the Blu-ray release of the film.

Alternate endings
Two alternate endings were shot but neither of them made it to the final cut, they include:
 After the incident in the subway the film's plot cuts to nine months later where Julia is shown hospitalized in a mental institution. Julia manages to convince a panel of psychiatrists including Dr. Booth that she has regained her sanity. She then sees one of the creatures climb through an air shaft in the ceiling but continues to deny their existence. She is finally released and proceeds to set up high powered lights all over her apartment room. The camera then pulls out of her bedroom as she is seen sitting on her bed. A door creaks open in her darkened hall and the film cuts to black. (This ending was shown to test audiences which was deleted and re-filmed after test audiences responded negatively to the ending; this ending is unavailable in any DVD.)
 Julia wakes up in the mental hospital and sees that all the people in her story − Dr. Booth, Sam, Billy, Terry - are patients in the mental hospital and her boyfriend Paul is a doctor working there. The doors to Julia's room then break open and one of "them" enters and seemingly attacks her until it is realized that it was all a delusion fabricated by Julia's mind and she had been suffering from Schizophrenia throughout the whole movie. (Some versions of the DVD and all Blu-ray versions have this ending available.)

Alternate opening
An alternate opening shown to test audiences featured a flashback of young Julia sleeping instead of a flashback of Billy. This opening was scrapped and is unavailable on any DVD.

Critical response
They holds a 39% approval rating on Rotten Tomatoes based on 57 reviews, and an average rating of 4.5/10. The site's consensus states: "They fails to sustain the level of creepiness necessary to rise above other movies in the horror genre." On Metacritic the film has a score of 31 out of 100 based on reviews from 16 critics, indicating "generally unfavorable reviews".

A. O. Scott of The New York Times wrote of the film: "Though you may share [the characters]' skepticism about the reality of those nightmare creatures, and occasionally twitch with impatience at the movie's clumsy dialogue and haphazard logic, you may also find yourself thoroughly terrified. I confess I was relieved when the movie ended and the lights came back on." Jamie Russell of the BBC awarded the film four out of five stars, writing: "None of it is likely to make this into the year's best horror movie, but as far as scaring the pants off you for an hour and a half, They will do that. And more." Peter Bradshaw of The Guardian wrote that the film "This entertaining scary movie isn't overly burdened with originality, but it's an enjoyable watch with some nicely creepy moments."

Writing for the San Francisco Chronicle, Mick Lasalle wrote: "Perhaps [executive producer] Craven was attracted by the metaphor of monsters and mental illness, but the metaphor is old, and director Robert Harmon does nothing to make it seem new again. Or perhaps Craven was just captivated by the movie's last and best scene, which is spooky enough to make They almost worth seeing."

See also
 Shadow person
 Sleep paralysis
 Night terror
 Darkness Falls, a 2003 horror film with a similar premise to this film

References

External links
 
 

2000s supernatural horror films
2000s monster movies
2000s English-language films
2000s American films
2002 horror films
American monster movies
American supernatural horror films
Dimension Films films
Films directed by Robert Harmon
Films scored by Elia Cmíral
Films about parallel universes
Films produced by Scott Kroopf
Focus Features films
Miramax films